Giovanni Battista Gentile Pignolo (Genoa, 1525 - Genoa, 1595) was the 71st Doge of the Republic of Genoa.

Biography 
He was elected to the dogal title on 19 October 1577, the twenty-sixth in biennial succession and the seventy-first in republican history. After his office on 19 October 1579, Giovanni Battista Gentile Pignolo was appointed perpetual procurator and continued to serve the Genoese state for other years.

See also 

 Republic of Genoa
 Doge of Genoa

References 

16th-century Doges of Genoa
1525 births
1595 deaths